David Heatley (born October 17, 1974) is an American cartoonist, illustrator, graphic designer, and musician.

Biography

Education 
Born in Teaneck, New Jersey, Heatley graduated from Teaneck High School in 1993. He graduated from the San Francisco Art Institute in 2000.

Comics
Though he studied painting and filmmaking at Oberlin College, Heatley started drawing comics regularly in the late 1990s. Since then, his comics and illustrations have appeared on the cover of The New Yorker, in The New York Times, McSweeney’s, Mome, and Kramers Ergot, among others. He has been featured three times in the Best American Comics series. Fantagraphics has published two issues of his solo comic book series, Deadpan, and Pantheon Books released his first full-length book, My Brain is Hanging Upside Down, in September 2008.

Music
Heatley's high school band Velvet Cactus Society released two albums on Shimmy Disc in the early 1990s. In 2008, he recorded (under his own name) a soundtrack to his graphic novel "My Brain is Hanging Upside Down", featuring a cover of The Ramones song by the same name. The soundtrack was released on WonderSound records.

Personal life 

Heatley lives in Jackson Heights, NY, with his wife Rebecca Gopoian (an agnostic, Jewish-Armenian poet) and their two children, Maya and Samuel Heatley.

Inspiration
Heatley lists among his influences Daniel Clowes, Gary Panter, Fort Thunder, and Paper Rad.

Selected works

Books
 My Brain is Hanging Upside Down (Pantheon Books, September, 2008)
 Otis Dooda, written by Ellen Potter, Feiwel & Friends, 2013
 Otis Dooda: Downright Dangerous, written by Ellen Potter, Feiwel & Friends, 2014
 Qualification: A Graphic Memoir in Twelve Steps, Pantheon, 2019

Solo Comics
 Deadpan #1 (Fantagraphics)
 Deadpan #2 (Fantagraphics)

Collaborative Comics
 My Home Birth by Christen Clifford

Anthology appearances

References

External links
 
 David Heatley's artist page at Drawger
 September 2007 interview on the Inkstuds radio show
 October 2008 interview from Comixology
 Heatley on comics and graphic design
 webcomic based on poem by Diane Wakoski

Alternative cartoonists
Underground cartoonists
People from Teaneck, New Jersey
Oberlin College alumni
Teaneck High School alumni
1974 births
Living people